Euphorbia haeleeleana, the Kauai spurge, is a species of flowering plant in the croton family, Euphorbiaceae, that is endemic to the islands of Kauai and Oahu in Hawaii. Like other Hawaiian spurges it is known as `akoko.

Associated plants include ōhia lehua (Metrosideros polymorpha), koa (Acacia koa), lama (Diospyros sandwicensis), kukui (Aleurites moluccanus), aalii (Dodonaea viscosa), wiliwili (Erythrina sandwicensis), hala pepe (Dracaena spp.), ohe kukuluāeo (Reynoldsia sandwicensis), and āulu (Sapindus oahuensis).

It is threatened by habitat loss and disturbance. Feral pigs and goats damage the habitat and non-native plant species take hold there and compete for resources.

References

haeleeleana
Endemic flora of Hawaii
Trees of Hawaii
Endangered plants
Plants described in 1971
Taxonomy articles created by Polbot